Anthony Hammond (1668–1738), of Somersham Place, Huntingdonshire and Lidlington, Bedfordshire, was an English official and Tory politician who sat in the English and British House of Commons between 1695 and 1708. He was also known  as a poet and pamphleteer.

Early life

Hammond was born on 1 September 1668,  the eldest son of Anthony Hammond  of Somersham Place, Huntingdonshire, who was the third son of Anthony Hammond (1608–1661) of St Alban's Court, Kent. His mother was Amy Browne (died 1693),  daughter of Henry Browne of Hasfield House,   Gloucestershire. He was educated at  home under Mr Kay from 1675 to 1676, at Willingham, Cambridgeshire under Samuel Saywell from 1676 to 1683 and at St Paul's School from 1684 to 1685. He succeeded his father who died in 1680. 

He was admitted at Gray's Inn in 1684 and at St John's College, Cambridge in 1685. It was said that he smuggled the actress and playwright Susanna Centlivre into his college, where she was disguised as a male cousin, "Jack". There she remained hidden for some months studying grammar. He made many and varied friendships with political and literary figures. He  entered the company of radical Whig theorists, including  Walter Moyle. Through Moyle he probably came into the circle of Tory and Whig ideologues and virtuosi who gathered at the Grecian tavern in the Strand.

When he came of age in 1689, Hammond was appointed to the Huntingdonshire lieutenancy and made a colonel  in the county militia. He was probably included on the commission of the peace, and took office in the corporation of the Bedford level. 

In 1690, he travelled abroad in the Low Countries. From February to September 1694, he was captain of foot in Thomas Farrington's  regiment.  He married, Jane Clarges, daughter of Sir Walter Clarges, 1st Baronet at Tunbridge Wells, Kent, on  14 August 1694. This was a highly political family, who were leading members  of the Tory party.

Parliamentary career

At the 1695 English general election, Hammond was returned as Tory  Member of Parliament for Huntingdonshire  in a hard-fought contest. He voted in March 1696 against fixing the price of guineas at 22 shillings, and refused to subscribe the Association which lost him his position on the commission of peace. He was active in opposing the attainder of Sir John Fenwick. 

After a quarrel that arose during a debate in the committee of privileges over the Cambridgeshire election, he fought a duel with Lord William Pawlet on 27 January 1698, and was wounded in the thigh. In parliament he spoke principally on financial questions.

At the 1698 English general election, Hammond was returned as MP for the University of Cambridge, and was made M.A. as a member of St John's College. 

Shortly afterward, he published anonymously Considerations upon the choice of a Speaker of the House of Commons in the approaching Session, in which he tacitly recommended Robert Harley for the office of Speaker against Sir Edward Seymour and Sir Thomas Littleton. Littleton was elected Speaker on  6 December 1698. This tract has been often reprinted. Hammond was returned again as MP for Cambridge University at the first general election of 1701, but at the second general election of 1701, he was defeated by Isaac Newton,  although Edward Villiers, 1st Earl of Jersey, Lord Chamberlain, wrote to the university in his favour. He found consolation in penning some Considerations upon Corrupt Elections of Members to serve in Parliament in 1701. 

On 17 June 1701, he had been appointed a commissioner for stating the public accounts. Under Godolphin's administration he was made a commissioner of the Navy in May 1702, and again entered parliament as member for  Huntingdon at the 
1702 English general election. At the 1708 British general election, he was returned for New Shoreham, Sussex, but on the ensuing 7 December the house decided by a majority of eighteen that as commissioner of the navy and employed in the out ports he was incapable of being elected or voting as a member of the house, and a new writ was ordered the next day.

Civil servant

In 1711, Hammond left England to take up his appointment as deputy-paymaster or treasurer of the British forces in Spain. 

The Duke of Argyll, commander-in-chief, complained of him for irregularity. Paymaster Hon. James Brydges, however, upheld Hammond in a report to Lord-treasurer Dartmouth, dated 11 November 1712, justifying the payments made by him to Portuguese troops.

His affairs became hopelessly involved, and he judged it best to retire to the Fleet Prison, and saved the remains of his estate for his eldest son. He occupied himself with literary pursuits.

Death, issue and character

Hammond died in the Fleet in 1738, but his estate was not administered until 8 April 1749. His wife died in 1749. They had two surviving sons: Thomas, who died childless about 1758; James Hammond (1710–1742), and three surviving daughters including Amy, who married first, in 1719, William Dowdeswell of Pull Court, Worcestershire; and secondly, on 7 May 1730, Noel Broxholme, M.D.

Thomas Hammond sold Somersham Place to the Duke of Manchester. Thomas Cooke, who formed Hammond's acquaintanceship in 1722, called him a flatterer of literary men. He was elected Fellow of the Royal Society 30 November 1698 but had withdrawn by 1718.  

According to Thomas Hearne, Hammond attempted to assassinate the Old Pretender in 1715.

Works

In 1720, Hammond edited A New Miscellany of Original Poems, Translations, and Imitations, by the Most Eminent Hands, viz. Mr. Prior, Mr. Pope, Mr. Hughes, Mr. Harcourt, Lady M[ary] W[ortley] M[ontagu], Mrs. Manley, &c., now first published from their respective manuscripts. With some Familiar Letters, by the late Earl of Rochester, never before printed (preface signed ‘A. H.’), London, 1720. He claimed some pieces of his own which had been ascribed to others, as the Ode on Solitude to Roscommon. 

In 1721, he permitted the publication of his Solitudinis Munus: or, Hints for Thinking (anon.), London, 1721. He also wrote a reasoned retrospect of the South Sea Bubble year, entitled A Modest Apology, occasion'd by the late unhappy turn of affairs with relation to Publick Credit. By a Gentleman 8vo, London, 1721. He says that he had made a list of 107 bubbles with a nominal stock of £93,600,000, involving a loss of £14,040,000.

Hammond prefixed to Walter Moyle's Works a memoir (signed ‘A. H.’). They had been intimate friends from 1690. Hammond contributed a ‘character’ of Edward Russell, 1st Earl of Orford to The Present State of the Republick of Letters for October 1730, from which Robert Samber drew his information for a verse eulogy on Orford in 1731, and wrote also another financial pamphlet entitled The National Debt as it stood at Michaelmas 1730, stated and explained (anon.), London, 1731.

His Collections and Extracts relating to the Affairs of the Nation, with an Autobiographical Diary, extending from 1660 to 1730, is preserved in the Bodleian Library.

References 

1668 births
1738 deaths
Members of the pre-1707 Parliament of England for the University of Cambridge
Fellows of the Royal Society
People educated at St Paul's School, London
Alumni of St John's College, Cambridge
Members of Gray's Inn
17th-century English poets
17th-century male writers
18th-century English poets
English pamphleteers
English MPs 1695–1698
English MPs 1698–1700
English MPs 1701
English MPs 1702–1705
English duellists
Civil servants in the Audit Office (United Kingdom)
English male poets
Members of the Parliament of England (pre-1707) for constituencies in Huntingdonshire